NA-116 Sheikhupura-IV is a constituency for the National Assembly of Pakistan.

Area
During the delimitation of 2018, NA-122 Sheikhupura-IV acquired areas from three former constituencies namely NA-134 (Sheikhupura-IV), NA-135 (Nankana Sahib-I-cum-Sheikhupura), and NA-136 (Nankana Sahib-II-cum-Sheikhupura), the areas of Sheikhupura District which are part of this constituency are listed below alongside the former constituency name from which they were acquired:

Areas acquired from NA-134 Sheikhupura-IV
Following areas of Safdarabad Tehsil
Bahalike
Following areas of Sheikhupura Tehsil
Farooqabad
Ajnianwala
Jhabran
Isherke
Waran
Kalo Ke

Areas acquired from NA-135 Nankana Sahib-I-cum-Sheikhupura
Safdarabad Tehsil (excluding Bahalike)

Areas acquired from NA-136 Nankana Sahib-II-cum-Sheikhupura
Following areas of Sheikhupura Tehsil
Mananwala

Members of Parliament

2018-2022: NA-122 Sheikhupura-IV

Election 2018 

General elections were held on 25 July 2018.

See also
NA-115 Sheikhupura-III
NA-117 Lahore-I

References 

NA-122
National Assembly Constituencies of Pakistan